Montezuma Z. White (September 6, 1872 – May 10, 1945) was the Republican President West Virginia Senate from Tyler County and served from 1925 to 1933.

References

West Virginia state senators
Presidents of the West Virginia State Senate
1872 births
1945 deaths